Siankievič is a gender-neutral Belarusian-language surname. It is derived from the given name Sieńka, a diminutive of Siamion  (Simeon).

Other forms: Polish: Sienkiewicz; Russian: Senkevich (transliteration from Cyrillic alphabet).

Notable people with the surname include:
 Aliaksandr Siankievič, Belarusian statesman
 Vasiĺ Siankievič, Belarusian linguist
 Viktar Siankievič, Belarusian historian
 Viktoryja Siankievič, Belarusian journalist and TV presenter
 Jan Siankievič (b. 1995), Belarusian footballer

References

Belarusian-language surnames